Hinduism in Sierra Leone is the religion of some South Asian expatriates. Hindus in Sierra Leone are primarily of South Asian descent and are usually traders. There were 3,550 Hindus (0.05%) in Sierra Leone in the year 2015 according to ARDA.

Freetown, the capital and principal city of Sierra Leone, has a large Hindu community, including a Hindu association and a priest. Hindus are allowed cremation in Freetown.

Following the exodus of expatriates in 1999 during the Sierra Leone civil war, the Indian community numbers dwindled to about 1500, mostly businessmen of Sindhi origin.

Demographics

In 2001, there were 4,750 Hindus (0.1%) which decreased to 1,942 Hindus (0.04%) in 2007 and then increased to 3,550 Hindus (0.05%) in 2015.

Temples
There is a functioning Hindu temple in Freetown. It is run by the local Temple Committee.

See also
Hinduism in Kenya
Hinduism in Togo

References

Religion in Sierra Leone
Sierra Leone
Sierra Leone